Katya Rubia is a Professor of Cognitive Neuroscience at the MRC Social, Genetic and Developmental Psychiatry Centre (SGDP Centre) and Department of Child and Adolescent Psychiatry, both part of the Institute of Psychiatry, King's College London.

She is best known for her work in child cognitive neuroscience and neuropsychiatry, particularly on disorders of impulsiveness, such as attention-deficit hyperactivity disorder, autism, obsessive-compulsive disorder, and conduct disorder. She uses techniques such as structural and functional magnetic resonance imaging (fMRI) and fMRI-neurofeedback.

Education and Profession 
Katya Rubia received her BA in Philosophy and Psychology in 1987 at the Complutense University of Madrid, Spain. She obtained her PhD in neuropsychology (on the neuropsychology of timing functions in brain lesion patients) in 1994 at the Ludwig-Maximilian University of Munich, Germany. After graduating, she was a post-doc research assistant for six months at the Technical University of Munich, in the Neurology Department. She was a post-doc research assistant in Amsterdam, Netherlands at the University of Amsterdam for one year from 1994-1995. Since 1995, she has been working at King's College London, Institute of Psychiatry (Child Psychiatry Department) in London, England, where she became Professor in 2008. She teaches cognitive neuroscience, and is head of the section of developmental neuropsychology and neuroimaging.

Research career
Some of Katya Rubia's early contributions to the field are that children with ADHD have difficulties with timing functions, which are closely associated with impulsiveness. Her main contribution to the field has been her work in neuroimaging of the disorder. She was a pioneer in imaging the brains of ADHD children in the 90s, which she carries on researching till today, and has substantially contributed to dispel the view that ADHD is a "myth" of naughty children by showing that ADHD is a neurodevelopmental disorder characterised by abnormalities in brain chemistry, brain structure and brain function.
She also has imaged a wide range of other child and adult psychiatric disorders such as autism, depression, schizophrenia, child abuse, obsessive-compulsive disorder and others with the aim to understand which brain abnormalities are specific to ADHD and which are shared with other childhood disorders.
Another line of research has been to investigate the effects of stimulant medication, the gold-standard treatment of ADHD, and of non-stimulant medications, on brain structure, function and chemistry in ADHD.

Recently her research is focusing on the clinical application of neuroimaging to help with diagnosis and treatment. She has used machine learning techniques to test whether we can diagnose ADHD patients based on structural and functional MRI scans. One other exciting direction Prof Rubia has taken with neuroimaging is using fMRI-Neurofeedback to teach children to self-regulate those brain regions that her research has shown to be underfunctioning. ADHD individuals have been found to have abnormalities in very specific regions of the brain, specifically the right prefrontal cortex. She does this by creating a video game that is connected to the brain activation the patients have to learn to increase, and in response a rocket ship moves higher in the sky within the game. </ref> . She also uses brain stimulation combined with cognitive training to modulate these brain regions that are not working well in ADHD patients. The hope is to develop brain therapies that have longer-term neuroplastic effects that can help to reduce the symptoms of ADHD.

Katya Rubia has over 200 publications in academic journals., an h factor of 98 and sits on the editorial board of the journals of "Biological Psychiatry", "Biological Psychiatry: Cognitive Neuroscience and Neuroimaging" and "ADHD".
She was awarded the Kramer-Pollnow prize in 2013 for her contribution to the research of child psychiatric disorders.
Katya Rubia is also a recipient of the 2019 and 2020 Highly Cited Researchers that recognises the world’s most influential researchers of the past decade, demonstrated by the production of multiple highly-cited papers that rank in the top 1% by citations for the field and year in Web of Science

Other interests 
Other interests are the research of the effects of Meditation on brain function and structure. She has also studied how meditation could be used as a complementary and alternative medicine (CAM) treatment in children with ADHD.

References

External links

Living people
British neuroscientists
British women neuroscientists
British women scientists
Academics of King's College London
Place of birth missing (living people)
Year of birth missing (living people)
Ludwig Maximilian University of Munich alumni